François Mignard (born 1949) is a French astronomer and the director of the CERGA Observatory of the Observatoire de la Côte d'Azur in southern France. He is an expert in space astrometry and Solar System dynamics, and played major roles in the European Space Agency's Hipparcos and Gaia missions. Mignard is an active member in several commissions of the International Astronomical Union and chairman of its working group that amends the standards for the International Celestial Reference System.

Honors 

Asteroid 12898 Mignard, discovered by astronomers with the LONEOS program in 1998, was named in his honor. The official  was published by the Minor Planet Center on 24 July 2002.

References

External links 
 François Mignard, active member of the International Astronomical Union

1949 births
20th-century French astronomers
Living people
21st-century French astronomers